The Armenian Rite is an independent liturgy used by both the Armenian Apostolic and Armenian Catholic Churches.

Liturgy 
The liturgy is patterned after the directives of Saint Gregory the Illuminator, first official head and patron saint of the Armenian Church. Churches of the Armenian rite have a curtain concealing the priest and the altar from the people during parts of the liturgy, an influence from early apostolic times.

The order of the Armenian celebration of the Eucharist or Mass is initially influenced by the Syriac and Cappadocian Christians, then (from the 5th century AD onwards) by Jerusalemites, then by Byzantines (from circa the 10th century) and lastly by the Latins. The Armenians are the only liturgical tradition using wine without added water. They also use unleavened bread for the Eucharist, which has been their historic practice.

From all the Armenian language anaphoras the only one currently in use is the anaphora of Athanasius of Alexandria. It became the standard anaphora of the Armenian Church before the end of the 10th century and is a translation of the Greek version. In research it is often attributed to Gregory of Nazianzus, or to an older version of the Armenian anaphora of St. Basil or seen as a composite text.

See also 
 Oriental Orthodox Churches
 Oriental Catholic Churches
 Georgian Byzantine-Rite Catholics

References

Bibliography

External links 
 New Catholic Dictionary: Armenian Rite
 Armenian rite Written by: The Editors of Encyclopaedia Britannica
 The Armenian Rite by armeniancatholic.org

Catholic liturgical rites
Eastern Christian liturgies
Oriental Orthodoxy